Busiris was launched at Newcastle upon Tyne in 1814 as a West Indiaman. She made one voyage as an East Indiaman and then returned to the West Indies trade. She was wrecked in May 1826.

Career
Busiris wqs offered for sale on 21 April 1815 in the Blackwall Canal, and first appeared in Lloyd's Register (LR) in 1815 with Frankland, master, Redmand & Co., owner, and trade London–Barbados.

On 3 July 1817 Busiris, Franklin, master, arrived at Gravesend from St Lucia.

The British East India Company (EIC) had in 1813 lost its monopoly on the trade between India and Britain. Numerous shipowners then tried out this newly-legal trade. On 2 December 1817 Busiris, J. Balston, master, sailed from Britain for Fort William (Calcutta). She was sailing under a license from the EIC. She arrived at Bengal on 4 May 1818.

Lloyd's Register for 1819 showed Busiriss master changing from Balston to Gardner, and her trade from London–Calcutta to London–St Vincent. On 14 April 1819 Busiris, Gardner, master, sailed from Gravesend for St Vincent.

A letter from St Kitts dated 9 June 1824 reported that Busiris, Gardner, master, had stopped there on 7 June on her way from Grenada due to a leak. The leak was stopped and Busiris sailed for London the next day.

On 30 December, at Cowes, Beaufort in coming in ran across Busiriss hawse, and sustained some damage.

Lloyd's Register for 1826 showed Busiris with R. Gardinar, master and owner. Her trade changed from London–New Brunswick to London–Grenada.

Fate
Busiris, of London, Jackson, master, wrecked on 28 May 1826 on Cobblers' Rocks, Barbados. Her crew was saved, but almost all of her cargo was lost.

Citations

References
 

1814 ships
Age of Sail merchant ships of England
Maritime incidents in May 1826